Chrysocatharylla agraphellus is a moth in the family Crambidae. It was described by George Hampson in 1919. It is found in South Africa, Mozambique and on Aldabra atoll in the Seychelles.

References

Moths described in 1919
Moths of Sub-Saharan Africa
Moths of Seychelles
Lepidoptera of Mozambique
Lepidoptera of South Africa